In analytic geometry, the intersection of two planes in three-dimensional space is a line.

Formulation
The line of intersection between two planes  and  where  are normalized is given by

where

Derivation
This is found by noticing that the line must be perpendicular to both plane normals, and so parallel to their cross product  (this cross product is zero if and only if the planes are parallel, and are therefore non-intersecting or entirely coincident).

The remainder of the expression is arrived at by finding an arbitrary point on the line.

If that is not the case, then a more complex procedure must be used.

Dihedral angle

References

Euclidean geometry
Computational physics
Geometric algorithms
Geometric intersection
Planes (geometry)